Luis Cálix may refer to:

 Luis Cálix (footballer, born 1965), Honduran football midfielder
 Luis Cálix (soccer, born 1988), American soccer defender and son of the Honduran footballer